Erin Leslie Fleming (August 13, 1941 – April 15, 2003) was a Canadian actress best known as the companion, secretary and manager of comedian Groucho Marx during his final years.

Early career
Fleming was born Marilyn Suzette Fleming on August 13, 1941, in New Liskeard, Ontario, Canada. She appeared in minor roles on television and in six feature films between 1965 and 1976, during which time she became acquainted with Groucho Marx and was initially hired as his secretary. Her most prominent film role was in the 1972 Woody Allen movie Everything You Always Wanted to Know About Sex* (*But Were Afraid to Ask).

Relationship with Groucho Marx

Fleming's influence and relationship with Groucho Marx were controversial. Groucho and Fleming met in 1971 and she was initially (and extemporaneously) hired as his secretary. Eventually, she assumed the role of his manager. Many  of Groucho's friends and colleagues acknowledged that she did much to revive his popularity, by arranging a series of personal appearances and one-man shows culminating in a sold-out performance at Carnegie Hall, which was recorded and issued on a best-selling record album. She also successfully lobbied for the honorary Academy Award Groucho received in 1974.  Several of Groucho's friends and family, including 
his son Arthur and youngest daughter Melinda, charged Fleming with embezzling money and pushing the increasingly frail Groucho to the limits of his endurance, largely for her own personal gain. There were also charges of psychological and suspected physical abuse. Groucho's friend, writer Sidney Sheldon wrote a roman à clef on Fleming's relationship with Groucho titled A Stranger in the Mirror, published in 1976. In a 1993 television adaptation, Lori Loughlin performed the role inspired by Fleming.

Groucho died on August 19, 1977, aged 86 (just four months after his late younger brother Gummo Marx's death). Litigation over his estate was eventually resolved in 1988 in favor of his three children: daughters, Miriam and Melinda and son, Arthur Marx; Fleming was ordered to repay $472,000 to Groucho's  estate.

Later life and death
Fleming was diagnosed with paranoid schizophrenia.  She was arrested in June, 1990 on suspicion of carrying a concealed loaded firearm, which she brought into the West Hollywood sheriff's office. She spent much of the last decade of her life impoverished, homeless, delusional, and in and out of various psychiatric facilities.

Fleming took her own life in Hollywood on April 15, 2003, at age 61. She was cremated and her ashes interred in Hornings Mills Cemetery, Horning's Mills, Ontario.

Filmography
 The Legend of Blood Mountain (1965) - Phyllis Stinson
 Hercules in New York (1970)
 Conquest of the Planet of the Apes (1972) - Cafe Customer (uncredited)
 Everything You Always Wanted to Know About Sex* (*But Were Afraid to Ask) (1972) - The Girl
 Sheila Levine Is Dead and Living in New York (1975) - Girl
 McCullough's Mountain (1975) - Phyllis Stinson

Television
 The Dick Cavett Show (December 16, 1971 – 1972) - Herself
 Adam-12 (Episode: "Venice Division", 1973) - Suzanne Martin

Sources
 Stefan Kanfer, Groucho: The Life and Times of Julius Henry Marx (2000), 
 Miriam Marx Allen, Love, Groucho:  Letters from Groucho Marx to his Daughter Miriam (1992), 
 Arthur Marx, My Life with Groucho (1992) revised from Life With Groucho (1954), 
 Steve Stoliar, Raised Eyebrows:  My Years Inside Groucho's House (1996),  
 Charlotte Chandler, Hello, I Must Be Going: Groucho and His Friends (1978),

References

External links
  from the May 9, 1977 issue of People.
  an article by Erin Fleming from the July 1983 issue of Movie Star.
 'The Marx Brothers Council Podcast' episode featuring a 1979 interview with Erin Fleming
 

1941 births
2003 deaths
Canadian film actresses
Canadian television actresses
People from Temiskaming Shores
Suicides by firearm in California
Actresses from Ontario
20th-century Canadian actresses
2003 suicides